Ugolino di Tedice (died after 1277), was an Italian painter and the brother of Enrico di Tedice.

Biography
He is documented as coming to Pisa in 1273 and 1277 and is known for religious works. He is considered to be the brother of Enrico because they both worked in Pisa. Some sources claim they are the same person.

References

1277 deaths
13th-century Italian painters
Italian male painters
People from Pisa
Painters from Tuscany
Year of birth missing